The Archdeacon of the East Riding is a senior ecclesiastical officer of an archdeaconry, or subdivision, of the Church of England Diocese of York in the Province of York. It is named for the East Riding of Yorkshire and consists of the eight rural deaneries of Beverley, Bridlington, Harthill, Howden, Hull, North Holderness, Scarborough and South Holderness.

History
Archdeacons occurred in the Diocese of York before 1093; before 1128, there were five serving simultaneously – probably each in their own area, but none occurs with a territorial title before 1133. The title Archdeacon of the East Riding is first recorded before 1133 with William FitzHerbert, Archdeacon of the East Riding (later Archbishop of York). Of the five archdeaconries, East Riding is one of three which has never split from York diocese.

The archdeaconry is vacant since the resignation of David Butterfield; the acting archdeacon is retired archdeacon Peter Harrison; the suffragan Bishop of Hull exercises episcopal oversight over the archdeaconry. On 28 July 2014, it was announced that Andy Broom is to become the next archdeacon proper.

List of archdeacons
Some archdeacons without territorial titles are recorded from around the time of Thomas of Bayeux; see Archdeacon of York.

High Medieval
bef. 1093–bef. 1114 (d.): Ranulph
bef. 1114–1143 (res.): William of York (William FitzHerbert)
bef. 1147–1153 (res.): Hugh de Puiset
bef. 1154–bef. 1162 (res.): John of Canterbury (Bellesmains)
bef. 1167–1181 (res.): Ralph de Warneville
1182–aft. 1189 (res.): Geoffrey (Plantagenet)
15 September 1189–aft. 1194: Burchard de Puiset/du Puiset
1196–1198 (res.): Eustace
bef. 1199–bef. 1218 (res.): Hamo (unclear)
bef. 1218–1227 (d.): Walter de Wisbech
bef. 1228–aft. 1230: Walter de Taney (later Archdeacon of Nottingham)
bef. 1235–aft. 1237: Walter de Woburn (later Archdeacon of Richmond)
bef. 1247–aft. 1261 (res.): Simon of Evesham (afterwards Archdeacon of Richmond)
bef. 1262–1279 (res.): Robert of Scarborough (afterwards Dean of York)
23 January 1280–before 1308 (d.): John de Crowcombe/de Craucombe

Late Medieval
–bef. 1322 (res.): Bertrand de Fargis
1316 (deprived): William de Ayremynne (royal grant)
4 May 1322–bef. 1343 (d.): Denis Haverel
bef. 1343–?: Aymer Cardinal Robert (Adhémar Robert, Cardinal-priest of Sant'Anastasia al Palatino; papal grant)
24 August 1343–: John de Cestre (royal grant)
29 December 1352–bef. 1359 (res.): William de Walcote
–1385 (res.): Walter Skirlaw
1364–1370 (res.): John de Hermesthorp (royal grant; ineffective)
8 February 1386 – 1389 (deprived): William de Waltham
1389–1390 (d.): Francis Cardinal Renzio de Alifia (Francesco Renzio, Cardinal-deacon of Sant'Eustachio)
1390–16 April 1396 (d.): Bartholomew Cardinal Oleari OSB (Bartolomeo degli Uliari, Cardinal-priest of Santa Pudenziana; papal grant)
1393–23 July 1409 (exch.): William Feryby (royal grant)
1396–bef. 1400 (res.): Christopher Cardinal de Maronibus (Cristoforo Maroni, Cardinal-priest of San Ciriaco alle Terme Diocleziane; papal grant)
23 July 1409 – 1416 (d.): William de Waltham (again)
20 October 1416 – 1418 (res.): Henry Bowet
25 September 1418 – 1435 (d.): John Wodham
26 March 1435–bef. 1464 (d.): Richard Tone
13 March 1464–bef. 1467 (d.): Robert Clifton
17 June 1467–bef. 1475 (d.): John Walter
14 December 1475 – 1480 (res.): Edmund Audley
1480–1485 (res.): Edward Pole (afterwards Archdeacon of Richmond)

13 January 1485–bef. 1493 (res.): William Poteman
27 March 1493 – 1497: Henry Carnebull (afterwards Archdeacon of York)
1497–bef. 1501 (d.): John Hole
1 May 1501 – 1504 (res.): Richard Mayew
12 June 1504 – 28 August 1550 (d.): Thomas Magnus

Early modern
13 April 1551 – 9 November 1558 (d.): John Dakyn
24 November 1558–bef. 1568 (d.): William Rokeby
bef. 1569–bef. 1569 (d.): Martin Parkinson
9 August 1569–bef. 1577 (res.): John May (also Bishop of Carlisle from 1577)
31 July 1578: John Gibson
10 March 1589–bef. 1615 (d.): Richard Remington
24 November 1615–bef. 1625 (res.): Marmaduke Blakiston
9 September 1625 – 1660 (res.): John Cosin
bef. 1661–June 1662 (exch.): Clement Breton (afterwards Archdeacon of Leicester)
June 1662–bef. 1675 (res.): Robert Hitch (Dean of York from 1664)
5 October 1675 – 6 March 1702 (d.): William Brearey
7 March 1702 – 8 April 1750 (d.): Heneage Dering
20 April 1750 – 30 May 1755 (res.): Jaques Sterne
30 May 1755 – 15 November 1784 (d.): Robert Oliver
11 December 1784 – 16 February 1786 (d.): Thomas Constable
3 March 1786 – 18 August 1828 (d.): Darley Waddilove
2 October 1828 – 10 January 1841 (res.): Francis Wrangham
14 January 1841 – 12 September 1854 (res.): Robert Wilberforce
4 October 1854 – 14 June 1873 (res.): Charles Long

Late modern
1873–1892 (res.): Richard Blunt (also Bishop suffragan of Hull from 1891)
1892?–3 June 1898 (d.): James Palmes
1898–1916 (ret.): Charles Mackarness
1916–1917: Unknown/vacant
1917–17 April 1931 (d.): Malet Lambert
1931–1934 (res.): Bernard Heywood, Bishop suffragan of Hull
1934–1957 (ret.): Henry Vodden, Bishop suffragan of Hull
1957–1970 (ret.): Frank Ford (archdeacon emeritus 1974–1976)
1970–1981 (res.): Donald Snelgrove
1981–1988 (res.): Michael Vickers
1988–1998 (ret.): Hugh Buckingham (afterwards archdeacon emeritus)
1999–2006 (ret.): Peter Harrison
February 2007–26 May 2014 (res.): David Butterfield
24 June 2014 – 6 October 2014 (Acting): Peter Harrison (again)
6 October 2014–present : Andy Broom

Notes

Sources

East Riding
 
Lists of English people